Kaizer Chiefs B is a South African football (soccer) club based in Johannesburg that plays in the DStv Diski Challenge.

The team is nicknamed Amakhosi which means "lords" or "chiefs" in Zulu and Phefeni Glamour Boys. They currently play most of their home games at Soccer City in Nasrec, Soweto, which is commonly also referred to as the FNB Stadium. The club is unarguably the biggest football club in the country in terms of success. It is also the most supported club in South Africa and the neighbouring countries of Botswana, Zimbabwe, Zambia etc. It has been estimated that the club has over 16 million supporters.

They have a local rivalry with Orlando Pirates, a fellow Soweto team which Chiefs founder Kaizer Motaung played for in his early playing career.

Kaizer Chiefs are known as Amakhosi by its fans. Their headquarters is Kaizer Chiefs Village, in Naturena, six kilometres south of Johannesburg.

The Club Also Has Developmentals in Cape Town & Durban As YouthTeams.

During the end of 2021-22 season of DStv  Diski Challenge, Arthur Zwane was appointed as a senior team head coach. Kaizer Motaung Junior appointed Vela Khumalo has a new head coach for Kaizer Chiefs Reserve team

Notable players
  Michael Buxleigh Teteh
  Wandile Duba
   Antonio Manuel Santos Henriques
   Samuel Tavares-Johnson
  Francis Kwigllingkok
  Kwethluke Kwigllingkok
  Lungelo Nkosi
  James McFarlane

Achievements
 Gauteng Reserve League 2013
 Gauteng Reserve League 2017
 Gauteng Reserve League 2021
 Gauteng Reserve League 2022
 Engen Knockout Cup 2017
 Engen Knockout Cup 2021
 Engen Knockout Cup 2022
 Nedbank Ke Yona Cup 2010
 Nedbank Ke Yona Cup 2016
 Nedbank Ke Yona Cup 2021
 SAFA Regionals Gauteng 2011
 SAFA Regionals Gauteng 2012
 SAFA Regionals Gauteng 2019
 SAFA Regional Western Cape 2014
 SAFA Regionals Western Cape 2020
 SAFA Regionals KwaZulu Natal 2020
 SAFA Regionals KwaZulu Natal 2021
 SAFA Regionals KwaZulu Natal 2022
 Telkom Charity Cup 2013
 Telkom Charity Cup 2015
 Telkom Charity Cup  2019
 DSTV Youth League 2020
 DSTV Youth Super Cup 2022
 Multichoice Diski Challenge 2017
 DSTV DIski Shield 2022

References

Soccer clubs in South Africa
Association football clubs established in 1970